Stanisław Tarło (died 1599/1601) was a Polish noble (szlachcic).

The son of Chorąży of Lwów Jan Tarło and Regina z Malczyc, he married Barbara Dulska, probably no later than 1593. They had two children together, Jan Karol Tarło and Paweł Tarło.

He was starost of Sochaczew and Zwoleń.

References

Bibliography

16th-century births
Year of death uncertain
Stanislaw